Afonso Pires Gato (1210-?) was a Portuguese medieval knight, who served in the court of Afonso III of Portugal.

He was the son of Pedro Nunes Velho and Maria de Baião, a remote descendant of Mendo Alão. His wife was Urraca Fernandes de Lumiares, descendant of Sancho Nunes de Barbosa and Sancha Henriques.

References 

1210 births
13th-century Portuguese people
Portuguese nobility